Pleasure Train is the first album by singer, songwriter, producer and composer Teri DeSario, released in 1978 by Casablanca (NBLP 7115).

The album includes the disco hit "Ain't Nothing Gonna Keep Me from You", which was written and co-produced by Barry Gibb. The version featured on this album is different from the 12" version. Also included was "You're the Stuff Dreams Are Made Of", which peaked at number forty-one on the disco chart.

CD release
Gold Legion released Pleasure Train on CD in early June 2012 as an expanded edition. The track listing included the extended 12" versions of "Ain't Nothing Gonna Keep Me from You" and "The Stuff Dreams Are Made Of".

Track listing
Side one
"The Stuff Dreams Are Made Of" (Joey Carbone, Lenny Lambert) – 3:25
"Back in Your Arms Again" (Denny Randell, Sandy Linzer) – 3:15
"Pleasure Train" (Bill Purse, Teri DeSario) – 4:24
"It Takes a Man and a Woman" (Denny Randell, Letty Jo Randell) – 3:52
"Save Me, Save Me" (Barry Gibb, Albhy Galuten) – 3:30
Side two
"Ain't Nothing Gonna Keep Me from You" (Barry Gibb) – 3:52
"Just Another Song and Dance Man" (Denny Randell, Sandy Linzer) – 3:01
"Someone Kind of Thing" (Betty Wright, Clay Cropper, Elise Kratish) – 2:44
"Baby, I Don't Want Your Love" (Bill Purse, Teri DeSario) – 3:08
"Loving You the First Time" (Bill Purse, Teri DeSario) – 3:45

Personnel
Produced by Ron Albert, Howard Albert and Denny Randall, except on "Sometime Kind of Thing" by Ron and Howard Albert, and on "Ain't Nothing Gonna Keep Me from You" by Barry Gibb, Albhy Galuten and Karl Richardson
Engineered by Bill Fair and David Yates
Teri DeSario: lead and backing vocals
Ken Bell: guitar
Mickey Buckins: percussion
Paul Harris: keyboards
Roger Hawkins: drums
David Hood: bass guitar
Jimmy Johnson: guitar
Randy McCormick: keyboards
Bill Purse: horn and string arrangements (on "Baby I Don't Want Your Love" and "The Stuff Dreams Are Made Of"), keyboards
George Terry: guitar (overdubs)
Laura Taylor: backing vocals
Bobby Caldwell: backing vocals
BRANDEY (Donna Davis, Cynthia Douglas, Pam Vincent): backing vocals
Mike Lewis: horn and string arrangements
Bill Fair: recording engineer (at Muscle Shoals Sound Studios)
David Yates: recording engineer (at Muscle Shoals Sound Studios)
Bruce Hensel: recording engineer (at Criteria Studios)
Jerry Masters: recording engineer (at Criteria Studios)
Don Gehman: recording engineer (at Criteria Studios)

On "Ain't Nothing Gonna Keep Me from You":
Teri DeSario: lead and backing vocals
Barry Gibb: backing vocals
Albhy Galuten: synthesizer
Joey Murcia: guitar
George Terry: guitar
George Bitzer: keyboards
Paul Harris: keyboards
George Perry: bass guitar
Stan Kipper: drums
Butch Polvermo: percussion
The Boneroo Horns:
Peter Graves
Whit Sidener
Ken Faulk
Neil Bonsanti
Vinnie Tianno
Chris Colclesser
Mike Lewis
Karl Richardson: recording engineer

References

Teri DeSario albums
1978 albums
Casablanca Records albums

ja:テリー・デサリオ